The 1997–98 Asian Club Championship was the 17th edition of the annual international club football competition held in the AFC region (Asia). It determined that year's club champion of association football in Asia.

Pohang Steelers of South Korea won their 2nd consecutive Asian Champions title, beating Dalian Wanda 6–5 on penalties.

First round

West Asia

|}

Byes: Al-Hilal (Saudi Arabia), Navbahor Namangan (Uzbekistan), Nisa Aşgabat (Turkmenistan), Persepolis FC (Iran), Taraz Zhambyl (Kazakhstan).

1 Al-Nasr withdrew. 
2 Riffa withdrew.
3 First leg also reported 1–2.

East Asia

|}

Intermediate Round

Central Asia

|}

Second round

West Asia

|}

East Asia

|}

Quarterfinals

West Asia

East Asia

Semifinals

Third place match

Final

References

Asian Club Competitions 1998 at RSSSF.com

1998 in Asian football
1997 in Asian football
Asian Club Championship seasons